Diamond White (born January 1, 1999) is an American singer and actress. In 2012, she was a contestant on the second season of the U.S. version of The X Factor, finishing in fifth place. She voices Frankie Greene on the Discovery Family series Transformers: Rescue Bots, Fuli on the Disney Junior series The Lion Guard and has had cameo appearances on The Haunted Hathaways and Sofia the First and a recurring role on Phineas and Ferb. She also provides the voice of Babs Buttman on the 2019 Netflix series, Pinky Malinky. In November 2020, she began on the CBS soap opera The Bold and the Beautiful in the contract role of Paris Buckingham, and in 2023, she began voicing Lunella Lafayette/Moon Girl in the Disney Channel animated series Moon Girl and Devil Dinosaur

Life and career

2007–2012: Early career and The X Factor
In 2007, she starred in a Chicago-based production of The Color Purple that toured nationally. In 2010, at the age of 11, White played Young Nala in Disney's The Lion King musical. She auditioned for The X Factor in San Francisco, California with "It's a Man's Man's Man's World" by James Brown. At the Bootcamp Part 1, White sang "I Have Nothing" by Whitney Houston, from the movie The Bodyguard. At Part 2, she was against Dinah Jane and they sang "Stronger". In the judges' home round, White sang Avril Lavigne's "I'm With You". Her mentor, Britney Spears, chose her to compete in the live shows. White performed "Hey, Soul Sister" during the first live show on October 31, 2012. On November 1, 2012, during the first live results show, White, along with Arin Ray, were put into a sing-off, with one of the contestants remaining in the competition and the other going home. White performed "Sorry Seems to Be the Hardest Word". Spears selected Ray to remain in the competition, sending White home. However, on the November 7, 2012 episode, White was reinstated into the competition as a wildcard, creating a Top 13. On the second live show that aired that same night, she again performed "I Have Nothing", receiving positive reactions from the judges and advancing into the Top 12. On November 14, 2012, she performed "Halo" and advanced into the Top 10. On November 21, 2012, she performed "Because You Loved Me" which earned her a spot in the Top 8. On November 28, 2012, she performed Whitney Houston's "I Wanna Dance with Somebody (Who Loves Me)" and was put into the Bottom Two along with Vino Alan, where she performed "I Was Here". The judges saved White, sending Alan home and advancing her to the Top 6. White performed James Brown's "It's a Man's Man's Man's World" and "Diamonds" during the December 5, 2012 episode and was put into the Bottom Two for the second time along with Fifth Harmony, where White performed "I Hope You Dance". The judges saved Fifth Harmony and sent White home for a second time, finishing fifth in the competition.

2013–present: Acting
In March 2013, White had a small role on The Big Bang Theory. She also performed a song with Toby Gad ("Peace") for world refugee day. In July 2013, White was featured in an episode of the Nickelodeon television series The Haunted Hathaways, thereafter becoming a recurring character on the show. She also voices the recurring character Ruby on the Disney Junior show Sofia the First. In May 2015, White was featured in a YouTube mashup of "Shut Up and Dance" by Walk the Moon and "Want to Want Me" by Jason Derulo with artist Sam Tsui. In June 2015, White announced during one of her videos that she was finishing her debut album and she was releasing the first single off of it soon. In September 2015, the first single "Born Rich" was released off the Pressure EP; White also released another song in October called "Lie On The Night". The EP was released in December 2015. In November 2015, White voiced Fuli the Cheetah in the television pilot film The Lion Guard: Return of the Roar and later on its TV show The Lion Guard which premiered in January 2016. In late-2016, White guest-starred as Sage on the third and final season of the popular Disney Channel television series Girl Meets World. In October 2016, White starred as Tiffany Simmons in Tyler Perry's horror comedy Boo! A Madea Halloween and, in October 2017, reprised her role in the sequel Boo 2! A Madea Halloween. White also portrayed the role of Piper in the 2018 film Rock Steady Row.  White has also been cast as a recurring guest star in the final season of Empire, a Fox series. She also played Babs Byuteman in the animated series Pinky Malinky in 2019. In 2020, she joined the cast of the CBS soap opera The Bold and the Beautiful as Paris Buckingham, sister of established character, Zoe Buckingham (Kiara Barnes); she made her debut on November 2, 2020. White voices the titular character in Moon Girl and Devil Dinosaur. White has also appeared on The Wayne Ayers Podcast.

Filmography

Discography

Albums

Singles

As lead artist

References

External links
 

1999 births
Living people
American child actresses
American child singers
American film actresses
American television actresses
American voice actresses
The X Factor (American TV series) contestants
21st-century American women singers
21st-century American actresses
Actresses from Detroit
African-American actresses
21st-century African-American women singers
American contemporary R&B singers
American women pop singers
Singers from Los Angeles
21st-century American singers